Take Me Home is the fifteenth studio album by American singer-actress Cher, released on January 25, 1979, on Casablanca Records. After her last three studio albums were commercial failures, Cher made a brief commercial comeback with Take Me Home. The album reached number 25 on the US Billboard 200. The RIAA certified it gold on May 17 of that year for the sales of 500,000 copies in the US.

Album information
Take Me Home was Cher's first album of 1979, and also her first released by Casablanca Records. It was produced by Bob Esty and Ron Dante, and most of the songs were written by Michele Aller and Bob Esty. This marked the beginning of her brief venture into disco music. Much to Cher's chagrin, she was pressured into recording an album of this genre. From the album came a major comeback hit, "Take Me Home". She contributed a lyrically self-penned song about her failed marriage to Gregg Allman on the closing ballad, "My Song (Too Far Gone)". This album is dedicated to "Butterfly".

The success of the title track boosted sales of the album and the album is also known for its cover photograph of a scantily-clad Cher in a gold, Bob Mackie designed Viking outfit which received a lot of attention at the time. Take Me Home was also the first album to have three tracks mixed: "Take Me Home" (12" Mix), "Wasn't It Good" (12" Mix) and "Git Down (Guitar Groupie)" (12" Mix) available on the "Hell on Wheels" single. Gene Simmons, her boyfriend at the time, received a credit on the album owing to his presence on the track "Git Down (Guitar Groupie)".

Take Me Home has been released on CD together with her second Casablanca Records album, Prisoner, numerous times in a CD entitled The Casablanca Years. This CD unites all the tracks from both albums, merging them onto one single CD. The album was released in 1993 and re-released in 1996 with a different cover. Unreleased songs from the sessions include "Oh God America", "Sometime Somewhere" both written by Cher but she didn't like her contributions so they were left off the inclusion on the album. The Ron Dante produced "If He'd Take Me Back Again" was also recorded during the Take Me Home sessions and remains unreleased.

Promotion
To promote the album, Cher recorded a music video for "Take Me Home" which was used as part of an exclusive TV special called Cher... and Other Fantasies. She also performed "Take Me Home" along with other two album tracks "Love & Pain" and "Happy Was the Day We Met" on The Mike Douglas Show. In 1979 Cher embarked on her first solo tour, the "Take Me Home Tour" which was highly successful with two dates of the show recorded for broadcast, in Monte Carlo and at Caesars Palace in Las Vegas. For the latter performance, Cher was awarded "Best Actress in a Variety Program" at the 1983 CableACE Awards.

Track listing
All tracks produced by Bob Esty except "Love & Pain (Pain in My Heart)" and "It's Too Late to Love Me Now" by Ron Dante.

Personnel
Cher – lead vocals
Jay Graydon – guitar
Steve Lukather – guitar on "Git Down (Guitar Groupie)"
Jeff Porcaro – drums on "Git Down (Guitar Groupie)"
David Hungate – bass on "Git Down (Guitar Groupie)"
Gene Simmons – backing vocals on "Git Down (Guitar Groupie)"
Bob Esty – record producer
Ron Dante – record producer
Larry Emerine – sound engineer
Richard Bowls – sound engineer
Janice Soled – project coordinator
Wayne Olsen – compilation producer
Barry Levine – photography

Charts

Weekly charts

Certifications

References

External links
Official Cher site

1979 albums
Albums produced by Ron Dante
Casablanca Records albums
Cher albums
Disco albums by American artists